Santessoniella is a genus of lichenized fungi in the family Pannariaceae. The classification reflects various changes made based on the Systema Ascomycetum and Myconet in the Deep Hypha issue of Mycologia.

The genus was circumscribed by Aino Marjatta Henssen in Acta Univ. Upsal., Symb. Bot. Upsal. vol.32 (1) on page 76 in
1997.

The genus name of Santessoniella is in honour of Rolf Santesson (1916–2013), who was a Swedish lichenologist and university lecturer.

Species
As accepted by Species Fungorum;
 Santessoniella pulchella 
 Santessoniella rugosa 

Former species;
 S. brunnea  = Austrella brunnea
 S. chilensis  = Austroparmeliella chilensis
 S. crossophylla  = Rockefellera crossophylla
 S. elongata  = Austroparmeliella elongata
 S. macrospora  = Psoroma macrosporum
 S. polychidioides  = Psoroma polychidioides
 S. rosettiformis  = Austroparmeliella rosettiformis
 S. saximontana  = Leciophysma saximontanum

References

Peltigerales
Lichen genera
Peltigerales genera
Taxa named by Aino Henssen